Nowth upon Nacht is a song for voice and piano by John Cage. It was composed in 1984 in memoriam for Cathy Berberian, the celebrated soprano singer, wife of composer Luciano Berio.

The text is from page 555–6 of James Joyce's Finnegans Wake, describing the darkest part of the night, and the activities of the characters, each written in a style reflecting their personalities. It follows the lyrical account of Infantina Isobel, who "night by silentsailing night [...] evencalm lay sleeping", which Cage used earlier in The Wonderful Widow of Eighteen Springs. Joyce switches to guttural Germanic language, to describe Joe Sackerson, the drunken Scandinavian watchman of the pub:

The vocal line is declamatory and uses a small number of high pitches. The pianist does not touch the keys but produces noises by opening and shutting the piano lid three times, with the sustain pedal depressed. The piece is intended to be performed directly after The Wonderful Widow of Eighteen Springs.

Editions
 Edition Peters 67039. (c) 1984 by Henmar Press.

See also
 List of compositions by John Cage
 A Flower

References

External links
 Jonh Cage's "Nowth upon Nacht", essay by Allen B. Ruch

1984 compositions
Compositions by John Cage
Finnegans Wake